The 2011 CHIO Rotterdam was the 2012 edition of the CHIO Rotterdam, the Dutch official show jumping horse show. It was held as CSIO 5* in show jumping, CDIO 3* and CDI 3* in dressage.

The first (national) horse show were held 1937 in Rotterdam, in 1948 it became an international horse show.

Nations Cup of the Netherlands (dressage)
The 2012 dressage Nations Cup of the Netherlands was part of the 2012 CHIO Rotterdam horse show. Teams of eight nations took part in this competition. The competition was held at June 20 (9:00 am to 12:00 noon) and June 21, 2012 (08:30 am to 1:30 pm).

Team result 
The team ranking of this competition was endowed with 27,000 €.

(grey penalties points do not count for the team result)

Individual results

FEI Nations Cup of the Netherlands (show jumping) 
The 2012 FEI Nations Cup of the Netherlands was part of the 2012 CHIO Rotterdam. It was the fourth competition of the 2012 FEI Nations Cup.

The 2012 FEI Nations Cup of the Netherlands was held at Friday, June 22, 2012 at 5:15 pm. The competing teams were: the Netherlands, Germany, the Switzerland, Belgium, France, Great Britain, Sweden and Ireland. The competition was a show jumping competition with two rounds and optionally one jump-off. The height of the fences were up to 1.60 meters.

The competition was endowed with 200,000 €.

(grey penalties points do not count for the team result)

Grand Prix Spécial 
At Friday Afternoon a Grand Prix Spécial was held as one competition of the CDIO 3*. 15 Riders with their horses started in this competition. The Grand Prix Spécial was endowed with 7,000 €.

Grand Prix Freestyle 
The InterChem prijs, the Grand Prix Freestyle (or Grand Prix Kür) of the 2012 CHIO Rotterdam, was the final competition of the CDIO 3* at the 2012 CHIO Rotterdam. InterChem was the sponsor of this competition.

The competition was held at Saturday, June 23, 2012 at 8:00 pm.

Longines Grand Prix Port of Rotterdam 
The Grand Prix was the mayor show jumping competition of the 2012 CHIO Rotterdam. The sponsor of this competition was Longines. It was held at Sunday, June 24, 2012 at 2:30 pm. The competition was a show jumping competition with one round and one jump-off, the height of the fences were up to 1.60 meters.

(Top 5 of 50 Competitors)

External links 
 
 timetable
 2012 dressage results
 2012 show jumping results

References 

CHIO Rotterdam
CHIO Rotterdam
CHIO Rotterdam